Mount Ansel Adams is a peak in the Sierra Nevada of California. At an elevation of 11,766 ft (3586 m). The summit is in Yosemite National Park near the park's eastern boundary. It was named in 1985 for Ansel Adams, the preeminent landscape photographer, conservationist, and member of the board of directors of the Sierra Club, a role he maintained for 37 years.

References

Mountains of Yosemite National Park
Mountains of Madera County, California
Sierra National Forest
Mountains of the Ansel Adams Wilderness
Mountains of Northern California